Estelle Nollet (born 1977 in Central African Republic) is a French writer.

Works 
2009: On ne boit pas les rats-kangourous, Paris, Albin Michel, series "Romans Français", 327 p. 
 -  Bourse Thyde Monnier de la SGDL (2009), Prix Obiou (2010), Prix Emmanuel Roblès (2010), Double Prix du jury et du public du premier roman de Chatou.
2011: Le Bon, la Brute, etc. , Albin Michel, series "Romans Français", 341 p. .
2015: Quand j'étais vivant, Albin Michel, series "Romans Français", 272 p. .

References

External links 
 Estelle Nollet on Babelio
 Estelle Nollet, ou l'ivresse des profondeurs on Le Monde (27 August 2009)
 Estelle Nollet - C'est la plongée sous-marine qui m’a permis d’écrire on Le Petit journal.com
 Estelle Nollet - Estelle Nollet Quand j'étais vivant  on YouTube

21st-century French novelists
Prix Emmanuel Roblès recipients
1977 births
Living people
21st-century French women writers